Thomas Foley, 1st Baron Foley FRS (8 November 1673 – 22 January 1733), of Witley Court, Great Witley, Worcestershire, was an English landowner, ironmaster and Tory politician who sat in the English and British House of Commons from 1694 until 1712, when he was raised to the peerage as Baron Foley as one of Harley's Dozen.

Foley was the eldest son of Thomas Foley and inherited the Great Witley estate on his father's death. His younger brothers were Edward Foley and Richard Foley. He was educated at Sheriffhales academy under John Woodhouse in 1689 and then for some years at Utrecht. He was admitted at Lincoln's Inn on 30 May 1695.

Foley was returned as Member of Parliament for Stafford at a by election on 21 November 1694 followed up by an unopposed return at the 1695 English general election. He was a Commissioner for taking subscriptions to the land bank in 1696. He held the seat at Stafford until 1712 when he was raised to the peerage, as one of 12 peers created on the recommendation of the Lord Treasurer, the Earl of Oxford, to give him a majority in the House of Lords.

Business
When the lease of ironworks at Wilden and Shelsley Walsh expired in 1708, Foley took them in hand and they were operated as an estate enterprise by him and successive owners of the estate until 1776.

Foley was elected a Fellow of the Royal Society in 1696.

Family
Foley married Mary Strode with whom he fathered seven children, five of them predeceasing their parents.  His only surviving son was Thomas Foley, 2nd Baron Foley, after whose death the title became extinct, while the estates devolved upon the latter's distant cousin Thomas Foley of Stoke Edith, Herefordshire, for whom the title was revived in 1776.

References

 Stuart Handley, 'Foley, Thomas, first Baron Foley (1673–1733)', Oxford Dictionary of National Biography, Oxford University Press, Sept 2004; online edn, Jan 2008 Retrieved 2 March 2008
 Burkes Peerage.

1673 births
1733 deaths
Members of Lincoln's Inn
Peers of Great Britain created by Queen Anne
Members of the Parliament of Great Britain for Stafford
English MPs 1690–1695
English MPs 1695–1698
English MPs 1698–1700
English MPs 1701
English MPs 1701–1702
English MPs 1702–1705
English MPs 1705–1707
British MPs 1707–1708
British MPs 1710–1713
Thomas
Fellows of the Royal Society
1
Members of the Parliament of England (pre-1707) for Stafford
Members of the Parliament of England for Droitwich